John Bourinot (March 15, 1814 – January 19, 1884) was a French-speaking Jersey-born Canadian merchant and politician, a member of the first Senate of Canada.

Born in Grouville, Jersey, in the Channel Islands, he was educated in Jersey and in Caen in Normandy in France and emigrated as a young man to Sydney, Nova Scotia, where he opened a business as a ship-chandler. In 1834, shortly after his arrival there, he was appointed French vice-consul and also worked as an agent for Lloyd's of London. In 1835, he married Margaret Ann Marshall, daughter of John George Marshall, from a politically influential local family. Together, they would have eleven children.

In the 1840s, Bourinot lobbied unsuccessfully for the independence of Cape Breton Island from Nova Scotia. In 1859, he was elected as the Conservative MLA of Cape Breton County in Halifax. Bourinot eventually sided with Charles Tupper, voting for the Confederation Resolution in 1866, and was appointed by John A. Macdonald as a Liberal-Conservative member of the first Senate of Canada.

His political career thereafter was unremarkable; Bourinot was mostly active in committee work. He died of a stroke in Ottawa, where he had wanted to attend the opening of parliament in 1884.

References
 
 

1814 births
1884 deaths
Canadian senators from Nova Scotia
Jersey emigrants to Canada
Conservative Party of Canada (1867–1942) senators
British emigrants to pre-Confederation Nova Scotia
People from Grouville
People from Sydney, Nova Scotia
Nova Scotia pre-Confederation MLAs